The Battle of Marietta was a series of military operations from June 9 through July 3, 1864, in Cobb County, Georgia, between Union and Confederate forces during the American Civil War. The Union forces, led by Maj. Gen. William Tecumseh Sherman, encountered the Confederate Army of Tennessee, led by Gen. Joseph E. Johnston, entrenched near Marietta, Georgia.

Battles

Several engagements were fought during this four-week period, including the battles of Pine Mountain (June 14), Gilgal Church (June 15), Kolb's Farm (June 22), and Kennesaw Mountain (June 27). Sherman forced Johnston to withdraw partially on June 18 to protect his supply lines, but the Union forces were not fully victorious until July 3.

Death of Lieutenant General Polk
On June 14, 1864, Confederate General Leonidas Polk, second cousin of former United States president James K. Polk was scouting enemy positions near Marietta, Georgia with his staff when he was killed in action by a Federal  shell at Pine Mountain. The artillery fire was initiated when Sherman spotted a cluster of Confederate officers—Polk, William J. Hardee, Johnston, and their staffs—in an exposed area. He pointed them out to Maj. Gen. Oliver O. Howard, commander of the IV Corps, and ordered him to fire on them. The 5th Indiana Battery, commanded by Capt. Peter Simonson, obeyed the order within minutes. The first round came close and a second even closer, causing the men to disperse. The third shell struck Polk's left arm, went through the chest, and exited hitting his right arm then exploded against a tree, cutting Polk nearly in two.

References
 

 CWSAC Report Update and Resurvey: Individual Battlefield Profiles

External links
 Battle of Gilgal Church

Marietta
Marietta
Marietta
Marietta
Leonidas Polk
Marietta
1864 in Georgia (U.S. state)
June 1864 events
July 1864 events